Ardastra Gardens, Zoo and Conservation Centre in Nassau, The Bahamas opened in 1937 though the work of the Jamaican horticulturist, Hedley Vivian Edwards.

From the Latin Ardua astrum, Ardastra means "Striving for the stars".

In the 1950s the Bahamian government brought flamingoes  with the intention of breeding, as they had become rare there. In 1982 the gardens were bought by Bahamian, Mr. Norman Solomon, who started the first Bahamian zoo.  Best known for its flamingos, the zoo now has about 200 animals.

External links

 Ardastra Gardens official home page

Nassau, Bahamas
Zoos in the Bahamas
Zoos established in 1982